Pomaderris brogoensis is a species of flowering plant in the family Rhamnaceae and is endemic to south-eastern New South Wales. It is a slender shrub or spreading tree with hairy branchlets, egg-shaped to more or less round leaves, and clusters of yellowish flowers.

Description

Taxonomy
Pomaderris brogoensis was first formally described in 1988 by Neville Grant Walsh in the journal Muelleria from specimens collected by David Albrecht in the Bemboka State Forest in 1986. The specific epithet (brogoensis) refers to the type location.

Distribution and habitat
This pomaderris usually grows on steep, north-facing slopes and occurs in scattered locations, mostly in the upper catchments of the Brogo River on the South Coast and Southern Tablelands of New South Wales.

References

brogoensis
Flora of New South Wales
Plants described in 1988